Soundtracks is a compilation album by the Krautrock group Can. It was first released in 1970 and consists of tracks written for various films. The album marks the departure of the band's original vocalist Malcolm Mooney, who sings on two tracks, to be replaced by new member Damo Suzuki. Stylistically, the record also documents the transition from the psychedelia-inspired jams of their earliest recordings (i.e. Monster Movie and Delay 1968) to the more meditative, electronic, and experimental mode of the studio albums that followed (such as Tago Mago and Ege Bamyası).

The back cover of the album states:
"CAN SOUNDTRACKS" is the second album of THE CAN but not album no. two ... Album no. two [Tago Mago] will be released in the beginning of 1971.

"She Brings the Rain", originally appearing in the 1969 film  by Thomas Schamoni (brother to directors Ulrich Schamoni and Peter Schamoni), was later featured in Wim Wenders' 1994 film Lisbon Story, the 2000 Oskar Roehler film Die Unberührbare and Tran Anh Hung's film Norwegian Wood, released in 2010.

"Don't Turn the Light On, Leave Me Alone" features Damo Suzuki's first recorded performance with Can.

Reception

In a review in Stylus Magazine, Nick Southall called Soundtracks "a strange beast of a record" that "appear[s] directionless", but has some "absolutely sublime moments". Dominique Leone wrote in Pitchfork that while many of the tracks on Soundtracks lack the "artistic reach" Can achieved on Monster Movie and other albums, they are not "throwaways". Leone called "Mother Sky" the album's highlight, adding that it "has an intensity matching anything on the debut".

In a review of Soundtracks in AllMusic, Jason Ankeny remarked: The dichotomy between the two singers is readily apparent: Suzuki's odd, strangulated vocals fit far more comfortably into the group's increasingly intricate and subtle sound, allowing for greater variation than Mooney's stream-of-consciousness discourse.

In March 2005, Q magazine placed "Mother Sky" at number 48 in its list of the 100 Greatest Guitar Tracks.

Track listing

Personnel
Can
Holger Czukay – bass, double bass
Michael Karoli – guitar, violin
Jaki Liebezeit – drums, percussion, flute
Malcolm Mooney – vocals on "Soul Desert" and "She Brings the Rain"
Irmin Schmidt – keyboards, synthesizers
Damo Suzuki – vocals on "Deadlock", "Tango Whiskyman", "Don't Turn the Light On, Leave Me Alone" and "Mother Sky"; percussion

References

External links

Can (band) albums
1970 compilation albums
Mute Records compilation albums
Liberty Records compilation albums
Soundtrack compilation albums
United Artists Records compilation albums
Albums produced by Holger Czukay
Albums produced by Michael Karoli
Albums produced by Jaki Liebezeit
Albums produced by Irmin Schmidt
Albums produced by Damo Suzuki